Francis Patterson "Frank" Abercrombie (January 2, 1850November 11, 1939) was an American professional baseball shortstop who made one appearance in the National Association for the Troy Haymakers in .

Early life and education
Abercrombie was born in Fort Towson, Oklahoma, then part of Indian Territory. His father was United States Army officer John Joseph Abercrombie, who would later go on to be one of the oldest field officers to serve in the American Civil War. Abercrombie attended Rensselaer Polytechnic Institute in Troy, New York, where he played baseball.

Professional baseball career
Abercrombie played in his only professional baseball game on October 21, 1871, against the Chicago White Stockings. Batting seventh in the Haymakers' lineup, Abercrombie recorded zero hits in four plate appearances, and in six fielding chances at short, recorded three assists, one putout, and two errors (out of 11 total committed by Troy). The Haymakers lost by a score of 11-5. For Troy's next game (their last of the season), their regular shortstop Dickie Flowers reclaimed his usual position.

Later life and death
After his brief time in professional baseball, Abercrombie worked as a civil engineer, and at one point served as the superintendent of the New York Division of the Pennsylvania Railroad.

Abercrombie died in Philadelphia, Pennsylvania in 1939.

References

External links

1850s births
1939 deaths
Major League Baseball shortstops
Troy Haymakers players
Baseball players from Oklahoma
People from Choctaw County, Oklahoma
19th-century baseball players
Rensselaer Polytechnic Institute alumni
American civil engineers
Pennsylvania Railroad people